The 2022 Open Ciudad de Valencia was a professional tennis tournament played on outdoor clay courts. It was the sixth edition of the tournament which was part of the 2022 ITF Women's World Tennis Tour. It took place in Valencia, Spain between 21 and 27 November 2022.

Champions

Singles

  Marina Bassols Ribera def.  Ylena In-Albon, 6–4, 6–0

Doubles

  Cristina Bucșa /  Ylena In-Albon def.  Irina Khromacheva /  Iryna Shymanovich, 6–3, 6–2

Singles main draw entrants

Seeds

 1 Rankings are as of 14 November 2022.

Other entrants
The following players received wildcards into the singles main draw:
  Irene Burillo Escorihuela
  Ángela Fita Boluda
  Andrea Lázaro García
  Mia Ristić

The following players received entry from the qualifying draw:
  Nuria Brancaccio
  Francesca Curmi
  Veronika Erjavec
  Claudia Hoste Ferrer
  Angelica Moratelli
  Sada Nahimana
  Lucie Nguyen Tan
  Iryna Shymanovich

The following players received entry as lucky losers:
  Çağla Büyükakçay
  Ilona Georgiana Ghioroaie
  Andreea Prisăcariu
  Chiara Scholl

References

External links
 2022 Open Ciudad de Valencia at ITFtennis.com
 Official website

2022 ITF Women's World Tennis Tour
2022 in Spanish tennis
November 2022 sports events in Spain